Aymeric Lusine (born 13 September 1995) is a French middle-distance runner specialising in the 800 metres. He won a bronze medal at the 2017 Summer Universiade.

International competitions

1Disqualified in the final

Personal bests
Outdoor
400 metres – 47.84 (Bordeaux 2017)
800 metres – 1:46.08 (Poitiers 2017)
Indoor
400 metres – 48.95 (Miramas 2019)
800 metres – 1:47.69 (Reims 2019)

References

1995 births
Living people
French male middle-distance runners
People from Saint-Saulve
Universiade bronze medalists for France
Universiade medalists in athletics (track and field)
Competitors at the 2019 Summer Universiade
Medalists at the 2017 Summer Universiade
Sportspeople from Nord (French department)
University of Poitiers alumni
20th-century French people
21st-century French people